Sandown railway station is a railway station serving Sandown on the Isle of Wight, England. It is located on the Island Line from Ryde to Shanklin.

History 

Sandown station is a double platform-faced through station.  However, from the mid 19th until the mid 20th century it was a junction station, also served by trains to and from Horringford, Merstone, Newport and Cowes.  These lines used to be run by separate companies, the Isle of Wight Railway (Ryde-Ventnor) and the Isle of Wight Central Railway (Newport-Sandown).

The adjacent land, which used to be occupied by coal-yards, is now a housing estate and the former Terminus Hotel pub opposite has long been a private house.
The line from Ryde to Shanklin was constructed between 1862 and 1864, and opened to passenger traffic on 23 August 1864.
The original station building was extended between 1870 and 1871 through the addition of a two-storey extension to act as station offices.

In 1923, with the Grouping, came the formation of the Southern Railway.  This brought all the railway services on the island under one management, and considerable modernisation. At first, it did not affect the services offered, but eventually the line from Ryde gained a more frequent service whilst the Merstone line declined. One particular feature of the Merstone line was the School Train, which was subsidised by the local authority, and for a significant time meant that the line remained viable.  When the line was closed, children from outlying villages going to the Sandown Schools were then transported by bus, the current situation.

Stationmasters

John Buckett 1864 - 1887
Albert Shaw 1888 - 1890 (afterwards station master at Ryde St John's)
Mark Gregory 1890 - 1910 (formerly station master at Ryde St John's)
George Pierce 1910 - 1919
Alex Wheway 1919 - 1941  (afterwards station master at Newport)
H.J. Attrill from 1941  (formerly station master at Brading)

Services 
As of May 2022, there are two trains in each direction per hour during the peak and one during the off-peak. Services call at all stations except Smallbrook Junction, which operates only during steam operating dates and times, and only one service an hour calls at Ryde Pier Head.

Trains to Ryde take about 13 minutes (to St. John's Road) or 19 minutes (to Ryde Pier Head). A journey from Sandown to Shanklin generally takes 6 minutes. From Shanklin there is a bus connection to Ventnor.

Gallery

References

External links 

Railway stations on the Isle of Wight
DfT Category F1 stations
Former Isle of Wight Railway stations
Railway stations in Great Britain opened in 1864
Island Line railway stations (Isle of Wight)
railway station